Aşağımollahasan höyük is a höyük (mound) in Özalp, Turkey, and is the first known settlement in prehistory in the area of Van. It was discovered by Charles A. Burney.

References

Archaeological sites of prehistoric Anatolia
Urartu
Kura-Araxes culture
Archaeological sites in Turkey